It was the first year of the Cold War, which would last until 1991, ending with the dissolution of the Soviet Union.

Events

January

 January–February – Winter of 1946–47 in the United Kingdom: The worst snowfall in the country in the 20th century causes extensive disruption of travel. Given the low ratio of private vehicle ownership at the time, it is mainly remembered in terms of its effects on the railway network.
 January 1 – The Canadian Citizenship Act comes into effect, providing a Canadian citizenship separate from British law.
 January 4 – First issue of weekly magazine Der Spiegel published in Hanover, Germany, edited by Rudolf Augstein.
 January 10 – The United Nations adopts a resolution to take control of the free city of Trieste.
 January 15 – Elizabeth Short, an aspiring actress nicknamed the "Black Dahlia", is found brutally murdered in a vacant lot in Los Angeles; the mysterious case is never solved.
 January 16 – Vincent Auriol is inaugurated as president of France.
 January 19 – Ferry  sinks in the South Euboean Gulf of Greece killing 392.
 January 24 – In the third phase of the Greek Civil War, Dimitrios Maximos forms a monarchist government in Athens and begins a brief term as prime minister.
 January 26 – A KLM Douglas DC-3 aircraft crashes soon after taking off from Kastrup Airport, Copenhagen, killing all 22 people on board, including Prince Gustaf Adolf, second in line to the Swedish throne, and American opera singer Grace Moore.
 January 31 – The Communists take power in the Polish People's Republic.

February

 February 3
 The lowest air temperature in North America (−63 degrees Celsius) is recorded in Snag, in the Yukon Territory.
 P.L. Prattis becomes the first African American news correspondent allowed in the United States House of Representatives and Senate press galleries.
 February 5
 Bolesław Bierut becomes the President of Poland.
 The Government of the United Kingdom announces the £25 million Tanganyika groundnut scheme, for cultivation of peanuts in the Tanganyika Territory.
 February 7 – The South Pacific Commission (SPC) is founded.
 February 8 – The Karlslust dance hall fire in Berlin, Germany, kills over 80 people.
 February 10 – In Paris, France, peace treaties are signed between the World War II Allies and Italy, Hungary, Romania, Bulgaria and Finland. Italy cedes most of Istria to the Socialist Federal Republic of Yugoslavia (later Croatia).
 February 12
 A meteorite creates an impact crater in Sikhote-Alin, in the Soviet Union.
 In Burma, the Panglong Agreement is reached between the Burmese government under its leader, General Aung San, and the Shan, Kachin, and Chin ethnic peoples at the Panglong Conference. U Aung Zan Wai, Pe Khin, Major Aung, Sir Maung Gyi, Dr. Sein Mya Maung and Myoma U Than Kywe are among the negotiators.
 February 17 – Cold War: The Voice of America begins to transmit radio broadcasts into Eastern Europe and the Soviet Union.
 February 20
 An explosion at the O'Connor Electro-Plating Company in Los Angeles leaves 17 dead, 100 buildings damaged, and a  crater in the ground.
 The U.S. Army Ordnance Corps Hermes program V-2 rocket Blossom I is launched into space, carrying plant material and fruitflies, the first living things to enter space.
 February 21 – Edwin Land demonstrates the first "instant camera", his Polaroid Land Camera, to a meeting of the Optical Society of America in New York City.
 February 22 – The Tom and Jerry cartoon Cat Fishin' is released.
 February 23 – The International Organization for Standardization (ISO) is founded.
 February 25
 The German state of Prussia is officially abolished, by the Allied Control Council.
 Hachikō Line derailment: The worst-ever train accident in Japan kills 184 people.
 John C. Hennessy, Jr. brings the first Volkswagen Beetle to the United States. He purchased the 1946 automobile from the U.S. Army Post Exchange in Frankfurt, Germany, while serving in the U.S. Army. The Beetle is shipped from Bremerhaven, arriving in New York this day.
 February 28 – In Taiwan, civil disorder is put down, with large loss of civilian lives.

March

 March 1
 The International Monetary Fund begins to operate.
 German rocket scientist Wernher von Braun marries his first cousin, 18-year-old Maria von Quirstorp.
 March 4 – The Treaty of Dunkirk (effective September 8) is signed between the United Kingdom and France, providing for mutual assistance in the event of attack.
 March 12 – The Cold War begins: The Truman Doctrine is proclaimed, to help stem the spread of Communism.
 March 14 – The Thames flood and other widespread flooding occurs, as the exceptionally harsh British winter of 1946–1947 ends in a thaw.
 March 15 – Hindus and Muslims clash in Punjab.
 March 19 – The 19th Academy Awards Ceremony is held. The movie The Best Years of Our Lives wins the Academy Award for Best Picture, along with several other Academy Awards.
 March 25 – A coal mine explosion in Centralia, Illinois, United States; 111 miners are killed.
 March 28 – A World War II Japanese booby trap explodes on Corregidor Island, killing 28 people.
 March 29 – A rebellion against French rule erupts in Madagascar.
 March 31 – The leaders of the Kurdish People's Republic of Mahabad, the second Kurdish state in the history of Iran, are hanged at Chuwarchira Square in Mahabad, after the state has been overrun by the Iranian army.

April 

 April – The previous discovery of the 'Dead Sea Scrolls' in the Qumran Caves (above the northwest shore of the Dead Sea) by Bedouin shepherds, becomes known.
 April 1
 Jackie Robinson, the first African American in Major League Baseball since the 1880s, signs a contract with the Brooklyn Dodgers.
 Paul I becomes King of Greece, aged 45, following the death of his brother, King George II.
 The 1947 Royal New Zealand Navy mutinies begin.
 April 4 – The International Civil Aviation Organization begins operations.
 April 7
 The Arab Ba'ath Party is established by merger in Damascus.
 Edaville Railroad opens in Massachusetts, as the first railway theme park.
The largest recorded sunspot group appears on the solar surface.
 April 9 
 Multiple tornadoes strike Texas, Oklahoma and Kansas, killing 184 and injuring 970.
 The Journey of Reconciliation in the Southern United States begins, organized by the Congress of Racial Equality.
 April 15 – Jackie Robinson becomes the first African American to play Major League Baseball since the 1880s.
 April 16
 Texas City disaster: The ammonium nitrate cargo of French-registered Liberty ship  explodes in Texas City, Texas in one of the largest man-made non-nuclear explosions in history, killing at least 581, including all but one member of the city fire department, injuring at least 5,000 and destroying 20 city blocks. Of the dead, remains of 113 are never found, and 62 are unidentifiable.
 American financier and presidential adviser Bernard Baruch describes the post–World War II tensions between the Soviet Union and the United States as a "Cold War".
 The first public demonstration of a TV camera zoom lens, the Jerry Fairbanks Zoomar, is held at NBC studios in New York.
 April 18
 The British Royal Navy detonates 6,800 tons of explosives, in an attempt to demolish the fortified island of Heligoland, Germany, in another of the largest man-made non-nuclear explosions in history.
 'Mrs. Ples', an Australopithecus africanus skull, is discovered in the Sterkfontein area in Transvaal, South Africa.
 April 20 – King Frederik IX succeeds his father, Christian X, on the throne of Denmark.
 April 26 – Academy Award-winning Tom and Jerry cartoon, The Cat Concerto, is released to theatres.

May

 May 1 – Portella della Ginestra massacre: The Salvatore Giuliano gang of Sicilian separatists opens fire on a Labour Day parade at Portella della Ginestra, Sicily, killing 11 people and wounding 27.
 May 2 – The movie Miracle on 34th Street, a Christmastime classic, is first shown in theaters.
 May 3 – The new post-war Constitution of Japan goes into effect.
 May 11 – The Ferrari 125 S, the first car to bear the Ferrari name, debuts.
 May 22
 The Cold War begins: In an effort to fight the spread of Communism, President Harry S. Truman signs an Act of Congress that implements the Truman Doctrine. This Act grants $400 million in military and economic aid to Turkey and Greece. The Cold War ends in 1991.
 David Lean's film Great Expectations, based on the novel by Charles Dickens, opens in the United States. Critics call it the finest film ever made from a Charles Dickens novel.
 May 25 – Hyundai Togun, the initial name of the Hyundai Group, is founded by Chung Ju-young.
 May 29
 An Air Iceland Douglas C-47 on a domestic flight in Iceland crashes into a mountainside killing all 25 people on board.
 A United States Army Air Forces Douglas C-54 Skymaster crashes on approach to Naval Air Station Atsugi, Japan, killing all 41 on board in the worst aviation accident in Japanese history up to this time.
 Douglas DC-4 Mainliner Lake Tahoe, operating as United Airlines Flight 521, fails to become airborne while attempting to take off from LaGuardia Airport in New York City, runs off the end of the runway, and slams into an embankment, killing 42 of the 48 people on board in the worst aviation disaster in American history until the following day.
 May 30 – Eastern Air Lines Flight 605: A Douglas C-54 Skymaster crashes near Bainbridge, Maryland, killing all 53 aboard (49 passengers, 4 crew), in America's worst commercial aviation disaster to this date.
 May 31
 Ferenc Nagy, the democratically elected prime Minister of Hungary, is forced into resign and go exile under pressure from the Soviet-backed Hungarian Communist Party led by Mátyás Rákosi. The fellow traveler Lajos Dinnyés replaces him, which grants the Communists effective control of the Hungarian government. 
 Alcide de Gasperi forms a new government in Italy, the first postwar Italian government not to include members of the Italian Communist Party.

June 

 June – The Doomsday Clock of the Bulletin of the Atomic Scientists is introduced.
 June 5 – U.S. Secretary of State George Marshall outlines the Marshall Plan for American reconstruction and relief aid to Europe, in a speech at Harvard University.
 June 7 – The Romanian Army founds the association football club CCA (Clubul Central al Armatei – The Army's Central Club), which will become the most successful Romanian football team during its time as CSA Steaua București.
 June 10 – SAAB in Sweden produces its first automobile.
 June 11–15 – The first Llangollen International Musical Eisteddfod is held in Wales.
 June 15 – The Estado Novo in Portugal orders 11 military officers and 19 university professors, who are accused of revolutionary activity, to resign.
 June 21 – The Parliament of Canada votes unanimously to pass several laws regarding displaced foreign refugees.
 June 23 – The United States Senate follows the House of Representatives, in overriding President Harry S. Truman's veto of the Taft–Hartley Act.
 June 24 – Kenneth Arnold makes the first widely reported UFO sighting near Mount Rainier, Washington.  Over 800 copycat sightings are reported throughout the US in the coming following weeks.  
 June 25 – The Diary of a Young Girl by Anne Frank is published for the first time as Het Achterhuis: Dagboekbrieven 14 juni 1942 – 1 augustus 1944 ("The Annex: Diary Notes from 14 June 1942 – 1 August 1944") in Amsterdam, two years after the writer's death in Bergen-Belsen concentration camp.

July 

 July 1 – The United States begins the National Malaria Eradication Program, successfully eradicating malaria in 1951. 
 July 6
 1947 Sylhet referendum: A referendum is held in Sylhet to decide its fate in the Partition of India.
 The first prototype AK-47 assault rifles are built to the design of Mikhail Kalashnikov.
 July 8 – Roswell UFO incident: A supposedly downed extraterrestrial spacecraft is reportedly found near Roswell, New Mexico.
 July 9 – King George VI of the United Kingdom announces the engagement of his daughter Princess Elizabeth to Lt. Philip Mountbatten.
 July 11 – The ship Exodus leaves France for Palestine, with 4,500 Jewish Holocaust survivor refugees on board.
 July 17 
 Indian passenger ship  is capsized by a cyclone at Mumbai, India, with 625 people killed.
 Alleged date when Raoul Wallenberg dies in a Soviet prison. It is not announced until February 6, 1957. There will be reported sightings of him until 1987.
 July 18
 Following wide media and UNSCOP coverage, the Exodus is captured by British troops, and refused entry into Palestine at the port of Haifa.
 President Harry S. Truman signs the Presidential Succession Act into law, which places the Speaker of the House and the President pro tempore of the Senate next in the line of succession, after the vice president.
 July 19 – Burmese nationalist Aung San, and six members of his newly formed cabinet, are assassinated during a cabinet meeting.
 July 26 – Cold War: U.S. President Harry S. Truman signs the National Security Act of 1947 into law to create the Central Intelligence Agency, the Department of Defense, the Joint Chiefs of Staff, and the National Security Council.
 July 27–28 – English endurance swimmer Tom Blower becomes the first person to swim the North Channel, from Donaghadee in Northern Ireland to Portpatrick in Scotland.
 July 29 
 After being shut down on November 9, 1946, for a refurbishment, the ENIAC computer in the United States is turned back on again, and remains in continuous operation until October 2, 1955.
 Original flying saucer witness Kenneth Arnold interviews Fred Crisman and Harold Dahl, who claims to have recovered material dropped from a flying saucer.  Dahl also reports the first modern so-called "Men in Black" encounter.

August

 August 1 – Indonesian airline Garuda Indonesia is established.
 August 2 – 1947 BSAA Avro Lancastrian Star Dust accident: A British South American Airways Avro Lancastrian airliner crashes into a mountain during a flight from Buenos Aires, Argentina to Santiago, Chile (the wreckage will not be found until 1998).
 August 5 – The Netherlands ends Operation Product, the first of its major politionele acties (military "police actions") in Indonesia.
 August 7
 Thor Heyerdahl's balsa wood raft, the Kon-Tiki, smashes into the reef at Raroia in the Tuamotu Islands, after a 101-day, 4,300 mile, voyage across the Eastern Pacific Ocean, demonstrating that prehistoric peoples could have traveled to the Central Pacific islands from South America.
 The Bombay Municipal Corporation formally takes over the Bombay Electric Supply and Transport (BEST).
 August 14
 The Muslim majority regions formed by the Partition of India gain independence from the British Empire as the Dominion of Pakistan. While the transition is officially at midnight on this day, Pakistan celebrates its independence on August 14, compared with India on the 15th, because the Pakistan Standard Time is 30 minutes behind the standard time of India.
 Muhammad Ali Jinnah becomes the first governor-general of Pakistan. Liaquat Ali Khan takes office as the first prime minister of Pakistan.
 August 15
 The greater Indian subcontinent, with a mixed population of Hindu, Sikhs, Buddhists, Jains, Zoroasters, Jews, Christians, Muslims and others formed by the Partition of India, gains independence from the British Empire, as the Dominion of India.
 Jawaharlal Nehru takes office as the first prime minister of India, taking his oath from Louis Mountbatten, Viscount Mountbatten of Burma, Governor-General of India (but no longer viceroy).
 August 16 – In Greece, General Markos Vafiadis takes over the government until 1949.
 August 23 – The prime minister of Greece, Dimitrios Maximos, resigns.
 August 27 – The French government lowers the daily bread ration to 200 grams, causing riots in Verdun and Le Mans.
 August 30 – A fire at a movie theater in Rueil, a suburb of Paris, France, kills 83 people.
 August 31 – In Hungary, communists fail to gain a majority in parliamentary elections (despite widespread fraud) and turn to direct action as part of the country's transition to Communism (1944–1949).

September

 September 9
 Women's suffrage is agreed by Argentina's Congress.
 A moth lodged in a relay is found to be the cause of a malfunction in the Harvard Mark II electromechanical computer, logged as the "First actual case of bug being found."
 September 13 – Indian Prime Minister Jawaharlal Nehru suggests the exchange of four million Hindus and Muslims between India and Pakistan.
 September 15–16 – Typhoon Kathleen strikes the Bōsō Peninsula and the entire Kantō region in Japan. Heavy rains cause the Arakawa and Tone Rivers to overflow and embankment collapse. The resulting floods and debris flow kill between 1,077 and 1,920 people, injuring 1,547 and leaving 853 missing.
 September 17–21 – The 1947 Fort Lauderdale hurricane in southeastern Florida, and also in Alabama, Mississippi, and Louisiana causes widespread damage, and kills 50 people.
 September 18 – In the United States:
 The National Security Act of 1947 becomes effective on this day, creating the United States Air Force, National Security Council and the Central Intelligence Agency.
 The Department of War becomes the Department of the Army, a branch of the new Department of Defense.
 September 22 – The Information Bureau of the Communist and Workers' Parties (Cominform) is founded by the International Communist Movement.
 September 30 – Pakistan and Yemen join the United Nations.

October 

 October
 The House Un-American Activities Committee begins its investigations into communism in Hollywood.
 First recorded use of the word computer in its modern sense, referring to an electronic digital machine.
 October 1 – The North American F-86 Sabre jet fighter aircraft makes its first flight.
 October 5 – President Harry S. Truman delivers the first televised White House address, speaking on the world food crises.
 October 14
 1947 Jammu massacres: Riots Alleged 20,000–100,000 people killed in    princely state of Jammu and Kashmir.
 United States Air Force test pilot Captain Chuck Yeager flies a Bell X-1 rocket plane faster than the speed of sound, the first time it has been accomplished.
 October 20 – A war begins in Kashmir, along the border between India and Pakistan, initiating the Indo-Pakistani War of 1947–1948. Also, Pakistan establishes diplomatic relations with the United States of America.
 October 24 – The first Azad Kashmir Government is established within Pakistan, headed by Sardar Muhammad Ibrahim Khan as its first President supported by the government of Pakistan.
 October 30 – The General Agreement on Tariffs and Trade (GATT), the foundation of the World Trade Organization (WTO), is established.

November 

 November 2 – In Long Beach, California, designer and airplane pilot Howard Hughes carries out the one and only flight of the Hughes H-4 Hercules ("Spruce Goose"), the largest fixed-wing aircraft ever built and flown. This flight only lasts 8 minutes.
 November 6 – The television program Meet the Press makes its debut, on the NBC-TV network in the United States.
 November 9 – Junagadh is invaded by the Indian army.
 November 10 – The arrest of four steel workers in Marseille begins a French communist riot, that also spreads to Paris.
 November 13 
 Wataru Misaka makes the roster of the New York Knicks to become the first person of color to play in modern professional basketball, just months after Jackie Robinson has broken the color barrier in Major League Baseball for the Brooklyn Dodgers. Misaka has led the Utah Utes to the 1944 NCAA and 1947 NIT championships.
 The Soviet Union completes development of the AK-47 assault rifle; it will be adopted by the Soviet Army in 1949 and become the most produced assault rifle in history.
 November 15
 The International Telecommunication Union becomes a specialized agency of the United Nations.
 The Universal Postal Union (UPU) becomes a specialized agency of the United Nations (effective July 1 1948).
 November 16
 In Brussels, 15,000 people demonstrate against the relatively short prison sentences of Belgian Nazi criminals.
 Great Britain begins withdrawing its troops from Palestine.
 November 17–December 23 – John Bardeen and Walter Brattain working under William Shockley at AT&T's Bell Labs in the United States demonstrate the transistor effect, a key element for the electronics revolution of the 20th century.
 November 17 – The Screen Actors Guild implements an anti-Communist loyalty oath.
 November 18 – Ballantyne's fire: A fire in Ballantynes department store in Christchurch, New Zealand, kills 41 people.
 November 20
 Wedding of Princess Elizabeth and Philip Mountbatten, Duke of Edinburgh: Princess Elizabeth (later Elizabeth II), the daughter of George VI of the United Kingdom, marries The Duke of Edinburgh at Westminster Abbey in London.
 Paul Ramadier resigns as Prime Minister of France. He is succeeded by Robert Schuman, who calls in 80,000 army reservists to quell rioting miners in France.
 November 21 – The United Nations Conference on Trade and Employment begins in Havana, Cuba. This conference ends in 1948, when its members complete the Havana Charter.
 November 24 – McCarthyism: The United States House of Representatives votes 346–17 to approve citations of Contempt of Congress against the "Hollywood Ten", after the screenwriters and directors refuse to co-operate with the House Un-American Activities Committee concerning allegations of communist influences in the movie business. The ten men are blacklisted by the Hollywood movie studios on the following day.
 November 25
 The New Zealand Parliament ratifies the Statute of Westminster, and thus becomes independent of legislative control by the Parliament of the United Kingdom.
 The new Pakistan Army and Pashtun mercenaries overrun Mirpur in Kashmir, resulting in the death of 20,000 Hindus and Sikhs.
 November 27 – In Paris, France, police occupy the editorial offices of the communist newspapers.
 November 29 – The United Nations General Assembly votes for the United Nations Partition Plan for Palestine which will partition Mandatory Palestine between Arab and Jewish regions, resulting in the creation of the State of Israel.

December 

 December – 1947 anti-Jewish riots in Aleppo, organised by the new Syrian government, result in some 75 Jews murdered and a Jewish exodus.
 December 2–4 – 1947 Aden riots: Yemeni Arabs attack Mizrahi Jews.
 December 2 – 1947 Jerusalem riots: Arabs protest against the United Nations Partition Plan for Palestine.
 December 3
 French communist strikers derail the Paris-Tourcoing express train because of false rumors that it is transporting soldiers; 21 people are killed.
 The Tennessee Williams play A Streetcar Named Desire, starring Marlon Brando in his first great role, opens at the Ethel Barrymore Theatre on Broadway in New York City; Jessica Tandy also stars as Blanche Du Bois.
 December 4 – French Interior Minister Jules S. Moch takes emergency measures against his country's rioters, after six days of violent arguments in the National Assembly.
 December 6
 Arturo Toscanini conducts a concert performance of the first half of Giuseppe Verdi's opera Otello, for a broadcast on NBC Radio in the United States. The second half of the opera is broadcast a week later.
 Women are admitted to full membership of the University of Cambridge in England. following a vote in September.
 December 9 – French labor unions call off the general strike, and re-commence negotiations with the French government.
 December 12 – The Iranian Royal Army takes back power in the Azerbaijan province.
 December 14 – Santiago Bernabeu Stadium is officially inaugurated in Madrid, and hosts its first match.
 December 21 – During the mass migration of Hindus and Muslims between the new states of India and Pakistan, 400,000 are slaughtered.
 December 22 – The Italian Constituent Assembly votes to accept the new Constitution of Italy.
 December 30 
 The Mikoyan-Gurevich MiG-15 jet fighter aircraft (NATO reporting name Fagot) makes its first flight in the Soviet Union.
 King Michael I of Romania is forced to abdicate and the Romanian monarchy is abolished.

Date unknown
 Raytheon produces the first commercial microwave oven, in the United States.
 Global casual fashion brand H&M (Hennes & Mauritz) is founded, and a first Hennes outlet store opens in Västmanland, Sweden.

Births

January

 January 1
 F. R. David, Tunisian-born French singer
 Vladimir Titov, Russian cosmonaut
 Frances Yip, Hong Kong singer
 January 6 
 Sandy Denny, British singer (d. 1978)
 Ian Millar, Canadian dressage rider
 January 8
 David Bowie, English singer, songwriter, and actor (d. 2016)
 Samuel Schmid, Swiss Federal Councillor
 January 10 – Peer Steinbrück, German politician
 January 13 – Carles Rexach, Spanish-Catalan footballer and coach
 January 15 – Andrea Martin, Canadian-American actress (Second City Television)
 January 16
 Juliet Berto, French actress, director and screenwriter (d. 1990)
 Apasra Hongsakula, Thai model, Miss Universe 1965
 Harvey Proctor, British Conservative politician
 January 18 – Takeshi Kitano, Japanese film director, actor
 January 20 – Cyrille Guimard, French road racing cyclist
 January 21 – Jill Eikenberry, American actress
 January 23
 Tom Carper, American politician
 Megawati Sukarnoputri, 5th President of Indonesia
 January 24
 Giorgio Chinaglia, Italian footballer (d. 2012)
 Michio Kaku, American theoretical physicist
 Warren Zevon, American rock musician (Werewolves of London) (d. 2003)
 January 25 – Tostão (Eduardo Gonçalves de Andrade), Brazilian footballer
 January 26 – Michel Sardou, French singer and actor
 January 27 – Björn Afzelius, Swedish singer, songwriter and guitarist (Hoola Bandoola Band) (d. 1999)
 January 29 – Linda B. Buck, American biologist, recipient of the Nobel Prize in Physiology or Medicine
 January 30 – Steve Marriott, British rock musician (d. 1991)
 January 31 – Jonathan Banks, American actor

February

 February 1 – Mike Brant, Israeli singer and songwriter (d. 1975)
 February 2 – Farrah Fawcett, American actress (Charlie's Angels) (d. 2009)
 February 3
 Paul Auster, American novelist
 Dave Davies, English musician (The Kinks)
 Melanie Safka, American rock singer
 February 4
 Halina Aszkiełowicz-Wojno, Polish volleyball player (d. 2018)
 Dennis C. Blair, American admiral, Director of National Intelligence
 John Campbell Brown, Scottish astronomer (d. 2019)
 February 5 – Regina Duarte, Brazilian actress; former Special Secretary of Culture of Brazil
 February 7 – Wayne Allwine, American voice actor (Mickey Mouse) (d. 2009)
 February 10 – Louise Arbour, Canadian jurist
 February 11
 Yukio Hatoyama, 60th Prime Minister of Japan
 Roy Moore, American politician
 Derek Shulman, Scottish musician (Gentle Giant)
 February 13 – Mike Krzyzewski, American basketball player and coach
 February 15
 John Adams, American composer
 Wenche Myhre, Norwegian actress, singer
 Ádám Nádasdy, Hungarian linguist and poet
 February 16 – Veríssimo Correia Seabra, Bissau-Guinean military commander (d. 2004)
 February 18
 Princess Christina of the Netherlands (d. 2019)
 José Luis Cuerda, Spanish filmmaker, screenwriter and producer (d. 2020)
 February 19 – Gustavo Rodríguez, Venezuelan actor (d. 2014)
 February 20
 Peter Osgood, English footballer (d. 2006)
 Peter Strauss, American actor
 February 21
 Victor Sokolov, Russian dissident journalist and priest (d. 2006)
 Renata Sorrah, Brazilian actress
 February 24
 Rupert Holmes, British-born American singer-songwriter (The Pina Colada Song)
 Edward James Olmos, Hispanic-American actor, director, producer and activist
 Juval Aviv, Israeli-American security consultant and former Mossad agent
 February 25
 Lee Evans, American Olympic athlete (d. 2021)
 Doug Yule, American rock singer (The Velvet Underground)
 February 26 – Sandie Shaw, British singer
 February 27 – Gidon Kremer, Latvian violinist
 February 28 – Stephanie Beacham, English actress

March

 March 1 – Alan Thicke, Canadian actor and television host (d. 2016)
 March 2 – Yuri Bogatyryov, Soviet actor (d. 1989)
 March 3 – Óscar Washington Tabárez, Uruguayan football manager and former player
 March 4
 Jan Garbarek, Norwegian musician
 Gunnar Hansen, Icelandic actor (d. 2015)
 March 6
 Kiki Dee, English pop singer (Don't Go Breaking My Heart)
 Dick Fosbury, American high-jumper (d. 2023)
 Teru Miyamoto, Japanese author
 Rob Reiner, American actor, comedian, producer, director and activist (All in the Family) 
 John Stossel, American journalist
 March 7 – Walter Röhrl, German racing driver
 March 8 
 Carole Bayer Sager, American singer, songwriter
 Michael S. Hart, American author, inventor (d. 2011)
 March 9 – Ryszard Peryt, Polish conductor, librettist (d. 2019)
 March 10 – Kim Campbell, Prime Minister of Canada
 March 11 – Geoff Hunt, Australian squash player
 March 12
 Kalervo Palsa, Finnish artist
 Mitt Romney, American businessman, politician, Governor of Massachusetts, 2012 presidential candidate, and US Senator (R-Ut.)
 March 13 – Beat Richner, Swiss pediatrician, cellist (d. 2018)
 March 15 – Ry Cooder, American guitarist
 March 16
 Baek Yoon-sik, South Korean actor
 Ramzan Paskayev, Chechen accordionist
 March 17
Yury Chernavsky, Russian-born composer, producer
Zhandra Rodríguez, Venezuelan ballet dancer
 March 18 – Tamara Griesser Pečar, Slovenian historian
 March 19 – Glenn Close, American actress
 March 21 – Ali Abdullah Saleh, President of Yemen (d. 2017)
 March 22 – James Patterson, American author
 March 24
 Mike Kellie, English rock musician (d. 2017)
 Louise Lanctôt, Canadian terrorist and writer
 Alan Sugar, English entrepreneur
 March 25 – Elton John, English singer-songwriter and composer 
 March 26 – Subhash Kak, Indian-American author
 March 31
 Wong Choon Wah, Malaysian footballer (d. 2014)
 César Gaviria, Colombian economist, politician and 28th President of Colombia

April

 April 1
 Alain Connes, French mathematician
 Ingrid Steeger, German actress, comedian
 Tzipi Shavit, Israeli actress
 April 2
 Paquita la del Barrio, Mexican singer, actress
 Emmylou Harris, American singer, songwriter
 Camille Paglia, American literary critic
 April 5 – Gloria Macapagal Arroyo, 14th President of the Philippines, daughter of president Diosdado Macapagal
 April 6 – John Ratzenberger, American actor (Cheers)
 April 7 – Florian Schneider, German musician (d. 2020)
 April 10 – Bunny Wailer, Jamaican reggae musician (d. 2021)
 April 12
 Tom Clancy, American author (d. 2013)
 David Letterman, American talk show host
 April 13 – Mike Chapman, Australian-born songwriter, record producer
 April 15 – Lois Chiles, American actress 
 April 16
 Kareem Abdul-Jabbar, African-American basketball player, actor (Airplane!)
 Gerry Rafferty, Scottish singer-songwriter ("Baker Street") (d. 2011)
 April 18
 Kathy Acker, American author (d. 1997)
 Jerzy Stuhr, Polish actor, director
 James Woods, American actor
 April 19 – Murray Perahia, American pianist
 April 20 
 Daud Ibrahim, Malaysian cyclist (d. 2010)
 Hector, Finnish rock musician
 April 21 – Iggy Pop, American rock musician
 April 24 – Josep Borrell, Spanish minister, MEP and EU High Representative 
 April 25
 Johan Cruyff, Dutch footballer and coach (d. 2016)
 Jeffrey DeMunn, American actor
 April 27 - Pete Ham, Welsh rock singer-songwriter and guitarist (suicide 1975)
 April 29
 Olavo de Carvalho, Brazilian journalist, essayist and professor of philosophy
 Tommy James, American rock singer, producer
 Jim Ryun, American middle-distance runner

May
 May 1 – Jacob Bekenstein, Mexico-born Israeli-American theoretical physicist (d. 2015)
 May 4 – Theda Skocpol, American sociologist
 May 5 – Malam Bacai Sanhá, Guinea-Bissau politician (d. 2012)
 May 6 – Martha Nussbaum, American philosopher
 May 8 – H. Robert Horvitz, American biologist, recipient of the Nobel Prize in Physiology or Medicine
 May 9 – Yukiya Amano, Japanese international civil servant (d. 2019)
 May 10 – Caroline B. Cooney, American author
 May 11
 Walter Selke, German physicist
 Butch Trucks, American drummer (The Allman Brothers Band) (d. 2017)
 May 12 – Michael Ignatieff, Canadian politician, philosopher and historian
 May 13 – Stephen R. Donaldson, American novelist
 May 14 
 José Gonzalo Rodríguez Gacha, Colombian drug lord (d. 1989)
 Tamara Dobson, African-American actress, fashion model (d. 2006)
Ana Martín, Mexican actress, singer producer and former model (Miss Mexico 1963)
 May 15 – Muhyiddin Yassin, Prime Minister of Malaysia
 May 17 – Hawa Abdi, Somali activist and doctor (d. 2020)
 May 18 – John Bruton, 10th Taoiseach of Ireland
 May 19 – Paul Brady, Northern Irish singer, songwriter
 May 21 – Lolit Solis, Filipina talent manager (host of Startalk, CelebriTV)
 May 24 – Maude Barlow, Canadian author, activist and National Chairperson of The Council of Canadians
 May 26 – Glenn Turner, New Zealand cricket captain
 May 27
 Peter DeFazio, American politician
 Branko Oblak, Slovenian football player and coach
 May 28 – Pedro Giachino, Argentine Navy officer (d. 1982)

June

 June 1
 Jonathan Pryce, Welsh actor
 Ronnie Wood, English rock musician (The Faces, The Rolling Stones)
 June 2 – Jarnail Singh Bhindranwale, Punjabi saint, Sikh theologian, military leader (d. 1984)
 June 3 – Dave Alexander, American musician (d. 1975)
 June 4 – Viktor Klima, Chancellor of Austria
 June 5 
 Laurie Anderson, American experimental performance artist, composer and musician
 Jojon, Indonesian comedian, actor (d. 2014)
 June 6
 David Blunkett, British politician
 Robert Englund, American actor (V, A Nightmare on Elm Street)
 Ada Kok, Dutch swimmer
 June 8 – Eric F. Wieschaus, American biologist, recipient of the Nobel Prize in Physiology or Medicine
 June 9
 Françoise Demulder, French war photographer (d. 2008)
 Robert Indermaur, Swiss painter and sculptor
 June 10 – Ken Singleton, American baseball player
 June 15
 Alain Aspect, French quantum physicist, recipient of the Nobel Prize in Physics
 John Hoagland, American war photographer (d. 1984)
 June 19
 Paula Koivuniemi, Finnish singer
 Salman Rushdie, Indian-born British author (The Satanic Verses)
 June 20 – Candy Clark, American actress
 June 21
 Rachel Adato, Israeli gynaecologist, lawyer and politician
 Shirin Ebadi, Iranian activist, Nobel Peace Prize recipient
 Fernando Savater, Spanish philosopher, author
 June 22
 Bruno Latour, French philosopher, anthropologist and sociologist (d. 2022)
 Natalya Varley, Soviet, Russian film, theater actress
 Murray Webb, New Zealand caricature artist, test cricketer
 David Jones, Northern Irish European Tour golfer
 Octavia E. Butler, American author (d. 2006)
 Trevor Blades, English cricketer
 Pete Maravich, American basketball player (d. 1988)
 Jerry John Rawlings, 2-time President of Ghana (d. 2020)
 June 23 
 Zvi Rosen, Israeli international footballer
 Bryan Brown, Australian actor
 Thor Hansen, Norwegian-born professional poker player
 Ed Werenich, Canadian curler
 June 24
 Mick Fleetwood, British musician (Fleetwood Mac)
 Helena Vondráčková, Czech singer
 Peter Weller, American actor and director
 June 25 – Jimmie Walker, African-American actor (Good Times)
 June 26 – Gulbuddin Hekmatyar, Afghan politician
 June 27
 Hans Ooft, Dutch football player, manager
 Abdel Djaadaoui, Algerian footballer
 June 29 – David Chiang, Hong Kong actor
 June 30 – Jean-Yves Le Drian, French minister

July

 July 1
 Marc Benno, American singer, songwriter and guitarist
 Arantxa Urretabizkaia, Basque writer, screenwriter and actress
 Sharad Yadav, Indian politician
 July 2 – Larry David, American actor, writer, producer and director (Curb Your Enthusiasm)
 July 3
 Betty Buckley, American actress, singer
 Mike Burton, American swimmer
 Rob Rensenbrink, Dutch football player (d. 2020)
 Jana Švandová, Czech actress
 July 4 
 Francisco Fernández de Cevallos, Mexican politician
 Eva Goës, Swedish politician
 Carla Panerai, Italian sprinter
 July 5 – Toos Beumer, Dutch swimmer
 July 6 – Shelley Hack, American model, actress, producer, political and media advisor
 July 7
 Richard Beckinsale, English actor (d. 1979)
 King Gyanendra of Nepal
 Felix Standaert, Belgian diplomat
 July 9
 Haruomi Hosono, Japanese musician (Yellow Magic Orchestra)
 O. J. Simpson, African-American football player and actor
 July 10 
 Allen Fong, Hong Kong film director
 Arlo Guthrie, American folk singer ("Alice's Restaurant") 
 July 11 – Riad Ismat, Syrian writer, critic and theatre director
 July 12 
 Gareth Edwards, Welsh rugby union player
Wilko Johnson, English rock musician (d. 2022)
 Lenka Termerová, Czech actress
 July 14 – Navin Ramgoolam, Prime Minister of Mauritius 
 July 15 – Roky Erickson, American singer-songwriter (d. 2019)
 July 16 
 Roelf Meyer, South African politician, businessman
 July 17 – Camilla, Queen Consort
 July 19 – Brian May, English rock guitarist (Queen)
 July 20
 Gerd Binnig, German physicist, Nobel Prize laureate
 Carlos Santana, Mexican-born rock guitarist 
 July 21 – Co Adriaanse, Dutch football manager
 July 22
 Albert Brooks, American actor, comedian, director, and novelist
 Erica Gavin, American actress
 Don Henley, American singer, songwriter and musician 
 July 24 – Peter Serkin, American classical pianist (d. 2020)
 July 25 – Scott Shannon, American disc jockey
 July 27 
 Bob Klein, American football player
 Kazuyoshi Miura, Japanese businessman (d. 2008)
 Giora Spiegel, Israeli footballer and coach
 July 28 – Su Tseng-chang, Taiwanese politician, 41st and 50th Premier of the Republic of China
 July 30
 William Atherton, American actor
 Françoise Barré-Sinoussi, French virologist, Nobel Prize laureate
 Arnold Schwarzenegger, Austrian-American actor, bodybuilder and 38th Governor of California
 July 31 - Richard Griffiths, English actor (d. 2013)

August

 August 1
 Lorna Goodison, Jamaican poet
 Leoluca Orlando, Italian politician
 August 4 – Hubert Ingraham, Bahamian politician
 August 5 – Graham Lovett, English footballer (d. 2018)
 August 7 – Franciscus Henri, Dutch-born Australian children's entertainer, composer and artist
 August 8 
 Terangi Adam, Nauruan politician
 George Costigan, British actor, screenwriter
 Ken Dryden, Canadian NHL goaltender, author and politician 
 August 9 – John Varley, American science-fiction author
 August 10
 Ian Anderson, British rock musician (Jethro Tull)
 Drupi, Italian singer
 Anwar Ibrahim, Malaysian politician
 August 11 
 Diether Krebs, German actor, cabaret artist and comedian (d. 2000)
 Wilma van den Berg, Dutch sprinter
 August 14 
 Maddy Prior, English folk singer
 Danielle Steel, American romance novelist
 August 15 
 Sonny Carter, American astronaut (d. 1991)
 Raakhee, Indian actress
 August 16
 Carol Moseley Braun, African-American politician 
 Marc Messier, Canadian actor
 August 17 – Mohamed Abdelaziz, Sahrawi politician
 August 20 – José Wilker, Brazilian actor (d. 2014)
 August 21 – Mary Simon, Governor General of Canada
 August 22
 Cindy Williams, American actress (Laverne and Shirley) (d. 2023)
 Peter Irniq, Canadian Commissioner of Nunavut
 August 23 – Willy Russell, British playwright
 August 24 – Roger De Vlaeminck, Belgian cyclist
 August 26 – Nicolae Dobrin, Romanian footballer (d. 2007)
 August 27 – Barbara Bach, American actress 
 August 28
 Emlyn Hughes, English footballer (d. 2004) 
 Liza Wang, Hong Kong actress
 Alice Playten, American actress (d. 2011)
 August 29 
 James Hunt, British 1976 Formula 1 world champion (d. 1993)
 Temple Grandin, American animal welfare and autism expert
 Jah Lloyd, Jamaican reggae singer, deejay and producer (d. 1999)
 August 30 – Allan Rock, Canadian politician, diplomat
 August 31
 Ramón Castellano de Torres, Spanish painter
 Somchai Wongsawat, 26th Prime Minister of Thailand

September

 September 3
 Kjell Magne Bondevik, Prime Minister of Norway
 Gerard Houllier, French football manager (d. 2020)
 September 5 
 Danny Florencio, Filipino basketball player (d. 2018)
 Buddy Miles, African-American drummer, singer and composer (d. 2008)
 Kiyoshi Takayama, Japanese yakuza boss
 September 6
 Jane Curtin, American actress, comedian (Saturday Night Live)
 Bruce Rioch, Scottish footballer, coach
 Jacob Rubinovitz, Israeli scientist
 September 8 – Amos Biwott, Kenyan Olympic athlete
 September 13 – Ajib Ahmad, Malaysian politician (d. 2011)
 September 14 
 Sam Neill, British-born New Zealand actor
 Jerzy Popieluszko, Polish Roman Catholic priest and blessed (d. 1984)
 September 15 – Theodore Long, American former professional referee and manager
 September 16 – Russ Abbot, British comedian, actor and singer
 September 17 – Tessa Jowell, British politician (d. 2018)
 September 19 – Tanith Lee, British author (d. 2015)
 September 21
 Don Felder, American musician and songwriter
 Stephen King, American writer and novelist, specializing in the horror genre
 September 22 – Jo Beverley, Anglo-Canadian writer (d. 2016)
 September 23 – Mary Kay Place, American actress 
 September 25
 Cheryl Tiegs, American model, actress
 Cecil Womack, African-American singer, songwriter (Womack & Womack) (d. 2013)
 September 26 – Lynn Anderson, American country music singer (d. 2015)
 September 27
 Dick Advocaat, Dutch football manager
 Meat Loaf, American rock singer, actor (d. 2022) 
 Denis Lawson, Scottish actor and director
 September 28 
 Luhut Binsar Pandjaitan, Indonesian politician and former military officer
 Marcelo Guinle, Argentine politician (d. 2017)
 Sheikh Hasina, 10th Prime Minister of Bangladesh
 September 30
 Marc Bolan, English rock musician (d. 1977)
 Rula Lenska, English actress

October

 October 1
 Aaron Ciechanover, Israeli biologist, Nobel Prize in Chemistry winner
 Stephen Collins, American actor 
 Mariska Veres, Dutch singer (d. 2006)
 October 2 – Ward Churchill, American author, activist
 October 3
 Alain Mucchielli, French physician
 Fred DeLuca, American entrepreneur, co-founder of Subway (d. 2015)
 John Perry Barlow, American internet activist, writer, and lyricist (d. 2018)
 October 4 – Ann Widdecombe, British politician
 October 5 – Brian Johnson, English rock singer (AC/DC)
 October 9 – France Gall, French singer (d. 2018)
 October 13 – Sammy Hagar, American rock musician (Montrose and Van Halen)
 October 14 – Nikolai Volkoff, Croatian-Russian professional wrestler (d. 2018)
 October 17 – Simi Garewal, Indian actress, producer, director, and talk show host
 October 18
 James H. Fallon, American neuroscientist
 Job Cohen, Dutch politician
 October 19
 Giorgio Cavazzano, Italian comics artist and illustrator
 Gunnar Staalesen, Norwegian author 
 October 20 – Abdul Hadi Awang, Malaysian politician
 October 24 – Kevin Kline, American actor
 October 26
 Hillary Clinton, American politician, First Lady, US Senator (D-Ny.), Secretary of State, and 2016 Democratic presidential candidate
 Ene Järvis, Estonian actress 
 October 28 – Henri Michel, French football player and coach (d. 2018)
 October 29 – Richard Dreyfuss, American actor
 October 30 – Timothy B. Schmit, American musician 
 October 31
 Carmen Alborch, Spanish feminist, writer and politician (d. 2018) 
 Herman Van Rompuy, Belgian politician, 66th Prime Minister of Belgium

November

 November 1 
 Taizo Ichinose, Japanese war photographer (d. 1973)
 Bob Weston, British musician (d. 2012)
 Salleh Ibrahim, Malaysian footballer (d. 2020)
 November 4 – Rod Marsh, Australian cricketer (d. 2022)
 November 5 – Rubén Juárez, Argentine bandoneonist, singer and songwriter of tango (d. 2010)
 November 6 – E. Lee Spence, German-born American pioneer underwater archaeologist, treasure hunter
 November 7
 Yutaka Fukumoto, Japanese professional baseball player
 Usha Uthup, Indian singer
 Sondhi Limthongkul, Thai journalist, writer and founder of Manager Daily
 Sefi Rivlin, Israeli actor, footballer and comedian (d. 2013)
 November 8 – Minnie Riperton, African-American singer (d. 1979)
 November 10
 Glen Buxton, American rock guitarist (d. 1997)
 Greg Lake, English musician, producer (King Crimson, Emerson, Lake & Palmer) (d. 2016)
 November 12 – Carlos Ezquerra, Spanish comics artist (d. 2018)
 November 13 – Joe Mantegna, American actor, producer and director
 November 14 – P. J. O'Rourke, American journalist, satirist (d. 2022)
 November 15
 Steven G. Kellman, American author, critic
 Bill Richardson, American politician and diplomat, United States Ambassador to the United Nations
 November 17
 Will Vinton, American animator, filmmaker (d. 2018) 
 Inky Mark, Canadian politician
 November 18 
 Lim Boon Heng, Singaporean politician 
 Ali Bakar, Malaysian football player (d. 2003)
 November 19 – Anfinn Kallsberg, Faroese Prime Minister
 November 20 
 Joe Walsh, American rock singer, songwriter and guitarist 
 Nurlan Balgimbayev, Kazakh politician (d. 2015)
 November 21
 Alcione, Brazilian singer
 Nickolas Grace, British actor
 Chua Ek Kay, Singaporean painter (d. 2008)
 November 22 - Terje Rød-Larsen, Norwegian diplomat, politician and sociologist 
November 24 – Dwight Schultz, American actor (The A-Team)
 November 25 – John Larroquette, American actor (Night Court)
 November 29 – Mirza Khazar, Azerbaijani author
 November 30
 Sergio Badilla Castillo, Chilean poet
 Stuart Baird, English film editor, producer and director
 Véronique Le Flaguais, Canadian actress
 David Mamet, American playwright
 Moses Nagamootoo, 8th Prime Minister of Guyana

December

 December 1 – Bob Fulton, English-Australian rugby league player (d. 2021)
 December 2 – Isaac Bitton, French rock  drummer 
 December 6 – Romildo Ribeiro Soares, Brazilian televangelist, missionary, author, singer, businessman and composer
 December 7
 Oliver Dragojević, Croatian singer (d. 2018)
 Johnny Bench, American baseball player
 Wendy Padbury, British actress
 Jeff Maxwell, American actor (M*A*S*H)
 December 8
 Gregg Allman, American singer, songwriter and musician (d. 2017)
 Gérard Blanc, French singer
 Thomas R. Cech, American chemist, Nobel Prize laureate
 December 9 – Tom Daschle, U.S. Senator
 December 10 – Rainer Seifert, German field hockey player
 December 11 – David E. Stone, American sound editor
 December 12 – Will Alsop, English architect
 December 14
 Christopher Parkening, American guitarist
 Dilma Rousseff, 36th President of Brazil
 December 16
 Ben Cross, English actor (d. 2020)
 Vincent Matthews, American athlete
 Trevor Żahra, Maltese novelist, poet and illustrator
 December 18 – Leonid Yuzefovich, Russian crime fiction writer
 December 21 – Paco de Lucía, Spanish guitarist (d. 2014)
 December 22 
 Mitsuo Tsukahara, Japanese gymnast
 Porfirio Lobo, 54th President of Honduras
 December 25 – Pepe Smith, Filipino rock musician (d. 2019)
 December 26 – Mariella Mehr, Swiss novelist (d. 2022)
 December 27 – Johann-Henrich Krummacher, German politician and clergyman (d. 2008)
 December 28 – Aurelio Rodríguez, Mexican Major League Baseball player (d. 2000)
 December 29 
 Ted Danson, American actor (Cheers)
 Cozy Powell, English drummer (d. 1998)
 December 30 – Jeff Lynne, British musician (Electric Light Orchestra) 
 December 31
 Rita Lee, Brazilian rock singer, composer
 Tim Matheson, American actor, film director and producer

Date unknown
 Marouf al-Bakhit, twice Prime Minister of Jordan

Deaths

January

 January 3 – Al Herpin, French-born American insomniac, "The Man Who Never Slept" (b. 1862)
 January 5 – Osami Nagano, Japanese admiral (b. 1880)
 January 9
 Herman Bing, German actor (b. 1889)
 Karl Mannheim, Hungarian sociologist (b. 1893)
 January 10 
 Arthur E. Andersen, American accountant (b. 1885)
 Hanns Sachs, Austrian psychoanalyst (b. 1881)
 January 11 – Eva Tanguay, Canadian-born vaudeville performer (b. 1878)
 January 12 
 Zdenko Blažeković, Yugoslavian politician (b. 1915)
 Júlio Afrânio Peixoto, Brazilian physician, writer, politician and historian (b. 1876)
 January 13 
 Sixto María Durán Cárdenas, Ecuadorian pianist, composer and lawyer (b. 1875)
 Ignazio Lupo, Italian-born American gangster (b. 1877)
 January 14 – Bill Hewitt, American football player (Chicago Bears), Pro Football Hall of Fame member (b. 1909)
 January 17 – Hryhoriy Khomyshyn, Ukrainian Roman Catholic bishop, martyr and blessed (b. 1867)
 January 18 – Maria Giovanna Fasce, Italian Roman Catholic religious professed, Augustinian nun and blessed (b. 1881)
 January 19 – Manuel Machado, Spanish poet (b. 1874)
 January 20
 Josh Gibson, African-American baseball player, MLB Hall of Fame member (b. 1911)
 Andrew Volstead, American politician (b. 1860)
 January 22 – Vivienne Haigh-Wood Eliot, British writer (b. 1888)
 January 23
 Pierre Bonnard, French painter (b. 1867)
 Roy Geiger, American general (b. 1885)
 January 24 – August Meyszner, Austrian-born SS officer (executed) (b. 1886)
 January 25 – Al Capone, American gangster (b. 1899)
 January 26
 Grace Moore, American opera singer, actress (b. 1898)
 Prince Gustaf Adolf, Duke of Västerbotten (b. 1906)
 January 27 – Vassily Balabanov, Soviet administrator, Provincial Governor of Imperial Russia (b. 1873)
 January 28 – Reynaldo Hahn, Venezuelan-born French composer (b. 1874)
 January 30 – Frederick Blackman, British plant physiologist (b.1866)

February

 February 3 – Petar Živković, Yugoslavian politician, 11th Prime Minister of Yugoslavia (b. 1879)
 February 4 – Luigi Russolo, Italian painter, composer (b. 1885)
 February 6 
 O. Max Gardner, Governor of North Carolina (b. 1882)
 Luigi Russolo, Italian Futurist painter, composer (b. 1885)
 February 11 – Martin Klein, Estonian wrestler (b.1884)
 February 12
 Kurt Lewin, German-born American psychologist (b. 1890)
 Sidney Toler, American actor (b. 1874)
 February 14 – Celestina Boninsegna, Italian soprano (b. 1877)
 February 15 – Mustafa Abdel-Razek, Egyptian Islamic philosopher (b. 1885)
 February 16 
 Pedro de Répide Gallegos, Spanish journalist, writer (b. 1853)
 Bertha Schwarz, German soprano (b. 1855)
 February 18 
 Valentina Dmitryeva, Soviet writer, teacher and doctor (b. 1859)
 Joachim Ernst, Duke of Anhalt (b. 1901)
 February 20 – Henry Herbert, British actor (b. 1879)
 February 23 – Hakim Habibur Rahman, Indian physician, writer, journalist and politician (b. 1881)
 February 24
 Morinosuke Chiwaki, Japanese dentist (b. 1870)
 Pierre Janet, French psychologist (b. 1859)
 February 26
 Antonino D'Agata, Italian politician (b. 1882)
 Heinrich Häberlin, Swiss politician, president of the Federal Council (b. 1868)
 Ben Webster, British-born American actor (b. 1864)
 February 27 – Heinrich Häberlin, Swiss Federal Councilor (b. 1868)

March

 March 2 – Whately Carington, British parapsychologist (b. 1892)
 March 5 – Alfredo Casella, Italian composer (b. 1883)
 March 9
 Carrie Chapman Catt, American suffrage leader (b. 1859)
 Jhaverchand Meghani, Indian poet, writer (b. 1897)
 March 10 – Harukichi Hyakutake, Japanese general (b. 1888)
 March 11 
Victor Lustig, Austrian-born con artist (b. 1890)
Wilhelm Heye, German general (b. 1869)
 March 12 – Walter Samuel Goodland, Governor of Wisconsin (b. 1862)
 March 15 
 Arthur Machen, British-born author (b. 1863)
 Jean-Richard Bloch, French critic, novelist and playwright (b. 1884)
 March 18 – William C. Durant, American automobile pioneer (b. 1861)
 March 19
 James A. Gilmore, American businessman and baseball executive (b. 1887)
 Prudence Heward, Canadian painter (b. 1896)
 March 20 – Victor Goldschmidt, Swiss geochemist (b. 1888)
 March 21 – Homer Lusk Collyer, American hermit brother (Collyer brothers) (b. 1881)
 March 23 
 Archduchess Louise of Austria, Princess of Tuscany (b. 1870)
 Ferdinand Zecca, French actor, producer, director and screenwriter (b. 1864)
 March 25 – Chen Cheng-po, Taiwanese painter (b. 1895)
 March 28
 Johnny Evers, American baseball player (Chicago Cubs), MLB Hall of Fame member (b. 1881)
 Karol Świerczewski, Polish military leader (b. 1897)
 March 29 – Manuel de Adalid y Gamero, Honduran composer (b. 1872)

April

 April 1 – King George II of Greece (b. 1890)
 April 5 – Petro Trad, Lebanese lawyer, politician, 14th Prime Minister of Lebanon and 5th President of Lebanon (b. 1876)
April 6 - Herbert Backe, German Nazi general (b. 1896)
 April 7 
 Henry Ford, American industrialist, automobile manufacturer (b. 1863)
 Savvas the New of Kalymnos, Greek Orthodox priest and saint (b. 1862)
 April 8 – Langley Collyer, American hermit brother (b. 1885)
 April 9 – William Foden, American composer (b. 1860)
 April 10 
 Charles Bally, Swiss linguist (b. 1865)
 John Ince, American actor (b. 1878)
 April 12 – Duke Robert of Württemberg (b. 1873)
 April 14 
 Ayoub Tabet, 6th Prime Minister of Lebanon (b. 1884)
 Salvador Toscano, Mexican director, producer and filmmaker (b. 1872)
 April 15 – Georg Friederici, German ethnologist (b. 1866)
 April 16
 Guido Donegani, Italian engineer, businessman and politician (b. 1877)
 Rudolf Höss, German commandant of Auschwitz concentration camp (executed) (b. 1900)
 April 18 – Jozef Tiso, Slovak politician, Roman Catholic priest, 1st Prime Minister of Slovakia and President of Slovakia (b. 1887)
 April 20 – King Christian X of Denmark (b. 1870)
 April 21 – Heitor da Silva Costa, Brazilian engineer, designer and constructor (b. 1873)
 April 23 – Gyula Károlyi, Hungarian politician, 29th Prime Minister of Hungary (b. 1871)
 April 24 – Willa Cather, American novelist (b. 1873)
 April 25 
 José María Reina Andrade, acting president of Guatemala (b. 1860)
 Ana Cumpănaș, Austro-Hungarian prostitute (b. 1889)
 April 26 – Francesco Paolo Finocchiaro, Italian painter (b. 1868)
 April 29
Gheorghie Ciuhandu, Romanian Orthodox priest, theologian, historian and advocate (b. 1875)
 Irving Fisher, American economist (b. 1867)
Karel Čurda, Czech soldier and parachutist (b. 1911)
 April 30
 Francesc Cambó, Andorran politician (b. 1876)
 Sir Almroth Wright, British bacteriologist and immunologist (b. 1861)

May

 May 8 – Harry Gordon Selfridge, American department store magnate (b. 1858)
 May 13 – Sukanta Bhattacharya, Bengali poet (b. 1926)
 May 14 – John R. Sinnock, 8th Chief Engraver of the United States Mint (b. 1888)
 May 15 – Miguel Abadía Méndez, Colombian politician, 12th President of Colombia (b. 1867)
 May 16
 Sir Frederick Gowland Hopkins, British biochemist, recipient of the Nobel Prize in Physiology or Medicine (b. 1861)
 Michael Joseph Curley, American Roman Catholic bishop and reverend (b. 1879)
 Zhang Lingfu, Chinese general of the National Revolutionary Army (b. 1903)
 May 17
 George Forbes, 22nd Prime Minister of New Zealand (b. 1869)
 Seabiscuit, thoroughbred racehorse (b. 1933)
 May 18 – Lucile Gleason, American actress (b. 1888)
 May 20 – Philipp Lenard, Austrian physicist, Nobel Prize laureate (b. 1862)
 May 23 – Charles-Ferdinand Ramuz, Swiss writer (b. 1878)
 May 28 – August Eigruber, Nazi war criminal (executed) (b. 1907)
 May 30 – Georg Ludwig von Trapp, Austrian sailor, patriarch of the Von Trapp Family of The Sound of Music fame (b. 1880)
 May 31 – Adrienne Ames, American actress (b. 1907)

June

 June 6 
 S. H. Dudley, American urban singer (b. 1864)
 Władysław Raczkiewicz, Polish politician, lawyer, diplomat and 5th President of Poland (b. 1885)
 José Marques da Silva, Portuguese architect (b. 1869)
 June 9
 Augusto Giacometti, Italian painter (b. 1877)
 J. Warren Kerrigan, American actor (b. 1879)
 June 11 – Richard Hönigswald, Hungarian-born American philosopher (b. 1875)
 June 14 – Albert Marquet, French painter (b. 1875)
 June 17 – Maxwell Perkins, American literary editor (b. 1884)
 June 18 
Alfred Allen, American actor (b. 1866)
 Richard Cooper, British actor (b. 1893)
 Shigematsu Sakaibara, Japanese rear admiral, convicted war criminal (executed) (b. 1898)
John Henry Patteron, Anglo-Irish soldier, hunter and author (b. 1867)
 June 19 – Kōsō Abe, Japanese admiral, convicted war criminal (executed) (b. 1892)
 June 20 – Bugsy Siegel, American gangster (assassinated) (b. 1906)
 June 22 – Jim Tully, American vagabond, pugilist and writer (b. 1891)
 June 24 – Bartolome Pagano, Italian actor (b. 1878)
 June 26 – R. B. Bennett, 11th Prime Minister of Canada (b. 1870)
 June 28 – Franciszek Mączyński, Polish architect (b. 1874)

July

 July 7 – José Luis Tamayo, 20th President of Ecuador (b. 1858)
 July 12 – Jimmie Lunceford, American jazz musician (b. 1902)
 July 15
 Walter Donaldson, American songwriter (b. 1893)
 Brandon Hurst, American stage, screen veteran (b. 1866)
 Henry Kolker, American actor (b. 1874)
 July 17 
 Raoul Wallenberg, Swedish diplomat, humanitarian (presumed dead on this date) (b. 1912)
 Prince Sisowath Youtevong, 4th Prime Minister of Cambodia (b. 1913)
 July 18 – Fumio Hayashi, Japanese physician (b. 1900)
 July 19 – Aung San, Burmese nationalist (assassinated) (b. 1915)
 July 21 – Patriarch Yousef VI Emmanuel II Thomas (b. 1852)
 July 23 
 Alice Fischer, American actress (b. 1869)
 Ángel Roffo, Argentine doctor (b. 1882)
July 25 - Kathleen Scott, British sculptor and wife of explorer Captain Robert Falcon Scott (b. 1878)
 July 26 – Archbishop Leontios of Cyprus (b. 1896)
 July 29 
 Leo Stein, American art collector, critic (b. 1872)
 George Bausewine, American baseball player, umpire (b. 1869)
 July 30
 Sir Joseph Cook, 6th Prime Minister of Australia (b. 1860)
 Fedir Krychevsky, Ukrainian painter (b. 1879)

August

 August – Teresa Magbanua, Filipino general (b. 1868)
 August 3
 José Pardo y Barreda, Peruvian politician, 51st Prime Minister of Peru and 2-time President of Peru (b. 1864)
 Vic Willis, American baseball player (Boston Braves), MLB Hall of Fame member (b. 1876)
 August 7 – Anton Denikin, Russian military leader (b. 1872)
 August 9 – Carlo Romanelli, Italian sculptor (b. 1872)
 August 10 – Antonio Sciortino, Maltese sculptor (b. 1879)
 August 15 – Claudio Granzotto, Italian Roman Catholic religious professed and blessed (b. 1900)
 August 17 – Prince Eugen, Duke of Närke (b. 1865)
 August 20
Franz Cumont, Belgian archaeologist, historian (b. 1868)
James Harbord, American general (b. 1866)
 August 21 – Ettore Bugatti, Italian car designer, founder of Bugatti (b. 1881)
 August 23 – Hasmik, Soviet actress (b. 1878)
 August 29
 Manolete, Spanish bullfighter (gored) (b. 1917)
 Kōtarō Nakamura, General of the Imperial Japanese Army (b. 1881)

September
 September 1 – Frederick Russell Burnham, American Scout, father of the international Scouting movement (b. 1861)
 September 8 – Victor Horta, Belgian Art Nouveau architect (b. 1861)
 September 9 – Ananda Coomaraswamy, Ceylonese-born American philosopher (b. 1877)
 September 10 – Hatazō Adachi, Japanese general (suicide) (b. 1890)
 September 11
Robert Lee Bullard, American general (b. 1861)
Alice Keppel, mistress of Edward VII (b. 1868)
 September 20
Fiorello H. La Guardia, Mayor of New York (b. 1882)
Jantina Tammes, Dutch plant biologist (b. 1871)
 September 21 
 Harry Carey, American film actor (b. 1878)
 Vasily Glagolev, Soviet general (b. 1896)
 September 26 – Hugh Lofting, British-born writer (b. 1886)
 September 27 – Luigi Barlassina, Patriarch of Jerusalem (b. 1872)

October

 October 1 
 Olive Borden, American actress (b. 1906)
 Gregorio Martinez Sierra, Spanish writer, poet, dramatist and director (b. 1881)
 October 2 – P. D. Ouspensky, Soviet mathematician (b. 1878)
 October 3 – Ernest L. Riebau, American politician (1895)
 October 4 – Max Planck, German physicist, Nobel Prize laureate (b. 1858)
 October 6 – Leevi Madetoja, Finnish composer (b. 1887)
 October 10 – Jo Mora, Uruguayan-born American cartoonist (b. 1876)
 October 12
 James Farley, American actor (b. 1882)
 Sir Ian Hamilton, British general (b. 1853)
 October 13 – Sidney Webb, 1st Baron Passfield, British economist, social reformer (b. 1859)
 October 16 – Anna B. Eckstein, German peace campaigner (b. 1868)
 October 17 – John Halliday, American actor (b. 1880)
 October 18 
 Harry C. Bradley, American actor (b. 1869)
 Massimo Terzano, Italian cinematographer (b. 1892)
 October 20 – Sir Albert Howard, English botanist and organic farming pioneer (b. 1873)
 October 23 – Carl Shelton, American gangster (b. 1888)
 October 24 – Dudley Digges, Irish actor (b. 1879)
 October 27 – María Teresalina Sánchez, Spanish Franciscan religious sister, missionary and martyr (b. 1918)
 October 29 – Frances Cleveland, First Lady of the United States (b. 1864)

November

 November 6 – Ernie Adams, American actor (b. 1885)
 November 7 – Sándor Garbai, Prime Minister of Hungary (b. 1879)
 November 8
 Mariano Benlliure, Spanish sculptor (b. 1862)
 Constantin Sănătescu, Romanian general, statesman and 44th Prime Minister of Romania (b. 1885)
 November 15 – Eduard Ritter von Schleich, German fighter ace, air force general (b. 1888)
 November 16 – Giuseppe Volpi, Italian businessman, politician (b. 1877)
 November 17 – Josaphat Kotsylovsky, Ukrainian Roman Catholic bishop, martyr and blessed (b. 1876)
 November 20 – Georg Kolbe, German sculptor (b. 1877)
 November 28
 W. E. Lawrence, American actor (b. 1896)
 Philippe Leclerc de Hauteclocque, French general (b. 1902)
 November 30 – Ernst Lubitsch, German film director (b. 1892)

December

 December 1
 Aleister Crowley, British occultist (b. 1875)
 G. H. Hardy, British mathematician (b. 1877)
 December 2 – Franz Xaver Schwarz, German Nazi politician (executed) (b. 1875)
 December 3 – Heinrich Hetsch, German physician, microbiologist (b. 1873)
 December 4 
 Margaret Butler, New Zealand sculptor (b. 1883)
 Walter Walker, American actor (b. 1864)
 December 6 – Tadashige Daigo, Japanese admiral (executed) (b. 1891)
 December 7
 Tristan Bernard, French writer, lawyer (b. 1866)
 Nicholas Murray Butler, American president of Columbia University, Nobel Peace Prize recipient (b. 1862)
 Henry Page Croft, 1st Baron Croft, British politician (b. 1881)
 December 9 – John Kelly, American actor (b. 1901)
 December 10 – Pierre Petit de Julleville, French Roman Catholic priest, bishop and eminence (b. 1876)
 December 12 – Huda Sha'arawi, Egyptian feminist (b. 1879)
 December 13 
 Nicholas Roerich, Russian painter (b. 1874)
 Juan Bautista Vargas Arreola, Mexican general during Mexican Revolution (b. 1890)
 December 14
 Stanley Baldwin, British Conservative politician, 3-time Prime Minister of the United Kingdom (b. 1867)
 Edward Higgins, General of The Salvation Army (b. 1864)
 December 15 – Arthur Machen, British writer (b. 1863)
 December 17
 Johannes Nicolaus Brønsted, Danish chemist (b. 1879)
 Christos Tsigiridis, Greek engineer (b. 1877)
 December 20 
 Benigno Aquino Sr., Filipino politician (b. 1894)
 Luigi Chiarelli, Italian playwright (b. 1880)
 December 23 – Ziauddin Ahmad, Indian educationalist and politician (b. 1878)
 December 25 – Gaspar G. Bacon, Lieutenant Governor of Massachusetts (b. 1886)
 December 27 – Johannes Winkler, German rocket pioneer (b. 1897)
 December 28 – King Victor Emmanuel III of Italy (b. 1869)
 December 29 – Han van Meegeren, Dutch painter, forger (b. 1889)
 December 30 – Alfred North Whitehead, British mathematician, philosopher (b. 1861)

Date unknown
 Ayoub Tabet, 6th Prime Minister of Lebanon (b. 1884)

Nobel Prizes

 Physics – Edward Victor Appleton
 Chemistry – Sir Robert Robinson
 Medicine – Carl Ferdinand Cori, Gerty Cori, Bernardo Houssay
 Literature – André Gide
 Peace – The Friends Service Council (UK) and The American Friends Service Committee (USA), on behalf of the Religious Society of Friends

References

External links
 Pathe newsreel, 1947. Experimental snowplough. Pathe says 'Grantham' but the station name 'Dowlais top' in Wales can be clearly seen
 Gallery of UK winter photographs (archived 31 May 2010)
 Personal testimony of the winter of 1947
 Stories from the winter of 1947 on Flickr